Agustín Díaz De Mera García Consuegra (born 27 September 1947 in Daimiel (Ciudad Real))
is a Spanish politician who served as a Member of the European Parliament with the People's Party, part of the European People's Party, from 2004 until 2019.

Díaz de Mera was elected to the Spanish Senate in 1989 and served there from 1996 to 2004 and to the Spanish Congress of Deputies in 1993 representing Avila.

In Parliament, De Mera was a member of the Committee on Civil Liberties, Justice and Home Affairs. On the committee, he served as the Parliament's rapporteur on the reform of Europol and visa requirements for non-EU nationals. He was also a substitute for the Committee on Agriculture and Rural Development and a member of the Delegation for relations with Iran.

Education
Graduate in modern and contemporary history
Diploma in European Community studies

Career
Director of the 'San Juan Evangelista' school (Madrid)
Secretary-General of the PP (Ávila)
Member of the PP National Executive Committee and of the PP Standing Committee in Castile and Leon
1996-2000: Chairman of the PP in Ávila
Deputy Mayor (Ávila)
1999-2002: Mayor of Ávila
Chairman of the Committee on Defence
2002-2004: Director-General of the Police
Member of the Parliamentary Assembly of the Council of Europe
Member of the WEU Assembly
1997-2001: Chairman of the Council of Europe Committee on Migration, Refugees and Demography
2000-2002: Chairman of the Spanish Delegation to the Parliamentary Assembly of the WEU

Decorations
Grand Cross of the Military Order of Merit with White Distinction
Knight Commander of the Order of St Gregory the Great, awarded by the Holy See
Gold medal of the ICPO-Interpol Secretariat-General

See also
2004 European Parliament election in Spain

References

External links

1947 births
Living people
Members of the 5th Congress of Deputies (Spain)
Members of the Senate of Spain
People's Party (Spain) MEPs
MEPs for Spain 2004–2009
MEPs for Spain 2009–2014
MEPs for Spain 2014–2019
People from Ávila, Spain
Spanish municipal councillors
Mayors of places in Castile and León